Jitesh Kishorekumar Gadhia, Baron Gadhia is a British investment banker, Conservative Party donor and member of the House of Lords. A member of the Leader's Group of high-value donors, he was described by The Herald as a member of David Cameron's "inner circle".

Education and career 
Gadhia was a pupil at Gayton High Comprehensive School (Harrow) from 1982-1986. Gadhia studied economics at the University of Cambridge and the London Business School, where he was a Sloan Fellow.

Gadhia is a senior managing director at The Blackstone Group, a US private equity firm. Prior to this, he worked for Barclays, ABN AMRO, and Barings Bank, which collapsed while he worked there. He also sits on the board of UK Financial Investments. Gadhia was a trustee of Nesta, and has written for The Daily Telegraph.

In September 2017, Gadhia was appointed a non-executive director of fracking company Third Energy, though questions were raised about a potential conflict of interest when the company was late publishing its annual results, amid concerns about its financial resilience and ability to fund clean-up costs. Gadhia resigned as a director in September 2018.

Political support 
He has donated at least £225,000 to the Conservative Party, and another £18,000 to the Conservative Friends of India. He has also donated at least £25,000 to the Liberal Democrats in Scotland.

He was involved in the cash for access scandal in 2014, along with James Stunt (billionaire art dealer, gambling and shipping tycoon) and Alexander Temerko (Russian energy tycoon), and approximately 40 others.

In August 2016 it was announced that he was to be made a life peer in as part of Cameron's Resignation Honours list. In the afternoon of 31 August he was created Baron Gadhia, of Northwood in the County of Middlesex.

In October 2022, he was appointed to the Court of Directors of the Bank of England.

References 

Year of birth missing (living people)
Conservative Party (UK) life peers
Life peers created by Elizabeth II
Investment bankers
Living people
British politicians of Indian descent